The European Nations Cup (ENC) First Division is the sixth edition of the so-called Six Nations B, since its launch in 2000.

The ENC is played over two years during which all teams meet each other home and away. The games are usually played in February and March during the Six Nations Championship, and in May to avoid very cold conditions in Eastern Europe. However the winner of this does not get promoted to the Six Nations.

Table
{|class="wikitable"
|-
!rowspan=2 width=30| Pos
!rowspan=2 width=145|Team
!colspan=4 width=120|Games
!colspan=3 width=90|Points
!rowspan=2 width=30|Table Points
|-
!width=30|Play
!width=30|Won
!width=30|Draw
!width=30|Lost
!width=30|For
!width=30|Ag.
!width=30|Diff.
|- bgcolor=#ccffcc align=center
|-
|- bgcolor=#ccffcc align=center
|1||align=left|||10||9||0||1||292||114||+178||28
|- bgcolor=#ffffff align=center
|2||align=left|||10||8||0||2||312||147||+165||26
|- bgcolor=#ffffff align=center
|3||align=left|||10||6||0||4||277||144||+133||22
|- bgcolor=#ffffff align=center
|4||align=left|||10||4||0||6||233||240||−7||18
|- bgcolor=#ffffff align=center
|5||align=left|||10||3||0||7||174||196||−22||16
|- bgcolor=#ffcccc align=center
|6||align=left|||10||0||0||10||59||506||−447||10
|}

Season 2007

Season 2008

See also
 2006-2008 European Nations Cup Second Division
 2006-2008 European Nations Cup Third Division
 Antim Cup
 FIRA – Association of European Rugby
 Six Nations Championship

External links
 Division 1 at FIRA-A.E.R. 
 Planet Rugby on the postponement of the November 10, 2007 Georgia-Portugal match.

2006–08
2006–07 in European rugby union
2007–08 in European rugby union
Europe
Europe
Europe
2006–07 in Spanish rugby union
2007–08 in Spanish rugby union
2006 in Russian rugby union
2007 in Russian rugby union
2008 in Russian rugby union
2006–07 in Romanian rugby union
2007–08 in Romanian rugby union